Virbia porioni is a moth in the family Erebidae first described by Hervé de Toulgoët in 1983. It is found in French Guinea.

References

porioni
Moths described in 1983